The following lists events that happened during 1884 in Chile.

Incumbents
President of Chile: Domingo Santa María

Events
4 April - Treaty of Valparaiso

Births
11 February - Alfonso Leng (d. 1974)

Deaths
9 June - Aníbal Pinto (b. 1825)

 
Years of the 19th century in Chile